Costanza Ghilini (1754–1775) was an Italian amateur painter.

Born in Alessandria, Ghilini was a member of the noble Provana di Collegno family; her parents may have been Vittorio Amedeo Ghilini, marchese di Maranzana and his wife, née Gabriella Maria Teresa dal Pozzo, but this is unconfirmed. She is recorded as having worked in pastel and oil, and to have been a fine performer on the mandolin as well. At her death she was memorialized in a sonnet by the poet Alessandro Sappa.

References

1754 births
1775 deaths
Italian women painters
Painters from Piedmont
18th-century Italian painters
18th-century Italian women artists
People from Alessandria